Macrocheles monticola is a species of mite in the family Macrochelidae.

References

monticola
Articles created by Qbugbot
Animals described in 2001